Drishyam 2: The Resumption, or simply Drishyam 2 is a 2021 Indian Malayalam-language crime thriller film written and directed by Jeethu Joseph and produced by Antony Perumbavoor through the company Aashirvad Cinemas.A sequel to their 2013 film Drishyam and the second installment to the series, the film stars Mohanlal, Meena, Ansiba Hassan, Esther Anil. The story takes place six years after the events of Drishyam.

Jeethu wrote the script for Drishyam 2 when the production works of his another film Ram, got interrupted due to COVID-19 pandemic. After a formal announcement made on Mohanlal's 60th birthday, 21 May 2020, the principal photography began on 21 September and concluded on 6 November 2020, while adhering to safety precautions set for preventing the spread of COVID-19. The film was shot extensively for 46 days in and around Thodupuzha in the same locations as Drishyam, and some scenes in Kochi. Anil Johnson composed the songs and score. Satheesh Kurup handled the cinematography and V. S. Vinayak edited the film.

Originally, the makers planned for a theatrical release, the producers later opted to release the film through the streaming service Amazon Prime Video. The film was released worldwide on 19 February 2021 to widespread critical acclaim, praising the narration style and performances (especially of Mohanlal).

Plot 
 
On the night of 3 August 2013, a man named Jose George is on the run from the authorities for murdering his brother-in-law. Hiding behind an unfinished police station, he sees Georgekutty emerging from it. Afterwards, he attempts to apologize to his wife, but ends up being arrested by the police.

Six years later
Georgekutty, Rani, Anju, and Anu are now leading a more prosperous life. Georgekutty is the owner of a successful movie theatre and yearns to produce his own film despite Rani's objections. He is in frequent contact with Vinayachandran, a prominent screenwriter, to prepare the screenplay for his film. Anju, on the other hand, suffers from epilepsy and PTSD a result of her fears of being arrested for her role in Varun's murder. To Rani's chagrin, a number of locals have resorted to spreading rumors about Anju having "venereal connections" with Varun. Rani's only source of solace is her friendly neighbor Saritha – a government clerk, who is often abused by her alcoholic husband, Sabu – a real estate broker.

The Kerala Police has been humiliated in their inability to decipher the truth behind Varun's case. Meanwhile, Georgekutty has an encounter with Varun's father Mr. Prabhakar, who vainly begs the former to disclose the location of his son's remains. Meanwhile, Anu comes home for spring break and invites her friends despite Rani's objections. With Georgekutty remaining aloof to her concerns, Rani spends more time with Saritha, and on one occasion, inadvertently blurts on the truth about her family's complicity in Varun's death. Unbeknownst to her, Saritha and Sabu are actually married undercover cops, assigned by IGP Thomas Bastin, who is a close friend and colleague of Geetha.

Meanwhile, Jose is released from prison. After struggling to make amends with his now-estranged family, he seeks to find employment. While coming to know that Georgekutty’s case is still ongoing, he recollects Georgekutty's presence at the police station which was under construction. Realizing that Georgekutty was indeed complicit in the murder, he tips Bastin – who later summons Geetha and Prabhakar from the U.S.A. After the trio bribes him with a sum of Rs. 500,000, Jose reveals Georgekutty's presence at the then-unfinished police station on the night of August 3. Armed with Jose's revelations, the authorities raid the police station, eventually unearthing a human skeleton. Concurrently, Georgekutty, having noticed the events through his CCTV cameras (which he had set up around the police station), seemingly gives up. Armed with the discovery of the human remains, Bastin, Geetha, and Prabhakar summons Georgekutty's family for an informal interrogation. Georgekutty, Rani, Anu and Anju manage to maintain their alibi. However, Geetha reveals a voice-recording of Rani's earlier confession to Saritha; the police had bugged the family residence earlier. Having exposed the family, Geetha turns to question Anju, resulting in the latter having another epileptic fit. Distraught, Georgekutty falsely confesses that he was the culprit in Varun's murder. With the police satisfied, the family is released and Georgekutty ends up being arrested, although Geetha isn't satisfied as she demands that Georgekutty's family be punished as well.

Later, Georgekutty is placed on trial for Varun's murder. Concurrently, Vinayachandaran, having learned about Georgekutty's arrest, pays a visit to Bastin, Geetha and Prabhakar. He reveals that during his business collusions with Georgekutty, the latter had fabricated a script for a future crime-thriller, loosely based on Varun's murder. He further reveals that Georgekutty had published a novel, titled Drishyam, based on the film script (although it was published under Vinayachandran's name, for copyright protection). The quartet is then informed that Georgekutty had officially pleaded not guilty, with his legal defence submitting that he had been framed by the authorities, which had "misused" Drishyam's plot as a means to incriminate him. Realizing that Georgekutty's earlier confession matches with Drishyam's plot, Bastin deduces that Georgekutty had created the novel and the confession, as a part of a scheme to escape legal punishment. Even more surprising, the DNA tests conducted on the skeleton revealed that it doesn't match Varun's DNA. Vinayachandran divulges that Georgekutty had fabricated an alternate climax for his film – in which the hero (Georgekutty), in his bid to evade legal punishment, would procure the remains of another person of same age and sex, who had died owing to similar injuries like that of the villain by befriending the gravedigger of the cemetery where that said body had been interred. The hero would keep the skeletal remains which he got from the cemetery with him for nearly three years, and befriend a security guard at the district medical college morgue under the pretext of offering him a chance in the film industry. On the night the remains excavated from the police station arrive at the morgue, after plying the security guard with drinks, the hero would switch the body in the morgue, just before the day the DNA analysis is to be performed.

With no physical evidence to prove his culpability, Georgekutty is released on personal bail. Georgekutty's lawyer requests the Judge to kindly direct the state police not to proceed against Georgekutty and his family for the time being as they are approaching the High Court of Kerala to stop all the proceedings against them in connection with the "so-called" crime. The Judge calls IG Bastin to his chambers and tells him that both Georgekutty's and Prabhakar's families truly deserve justice but the legal system is unable to provide it to them. The Judge also orders Bastin to end all investigations of Varun’s case, as unsolved cases are not new to the system. Outside the courthouse, Vinayachandran discloses to Geetha and Prabhakar that Georgekutty's alternate climax had a tail end as well: the hero would transfer the villain's ashes to his bereaved parents. Simultaneously, Georgekutty has Varun's cremated skeletal remains anonymously handed over to Geetha and Prabhakar.

As Prabhakar immerses Varun's ashes into the river, Bastin convinces Geetha to let go of her enmity with Georgekutty, saying that they will never succeed in punishing him since he is  keen on his intent to protect his family. Bastin also states that Georgekutty's life is his punishment, as the latter must constantly endeavor in his efforts to protect his family from the ever-watchful eye of the authorities. Meanwhile, Georgekutty, who was watching the trio from afar, leaves solemnly.

Cast

Production

Development 
Jeethu Joseph and Mohanlal were filming for Ram prior to the COVID-19 lockdown in India, however the shooting of the film was stalled as some sequences they want to film in foreign locations, such as London and Cairo. As the crew realised that the filming would take time to continue, Jeethu decided to start the works for Drishyam 2, a sequel to their 2013 film Drishyam which he had plans for some time. As the shooting of the film would only take place in Kerala, Jeethu realised it was most appropriate film to shoot after the lockdown ends. The film was officially announced by Mohanlal on his 60th birthday on 21 May 2020. It was intended to start filming soon after the government allows permission to begin film shootings. Mohanlal said during an interview that he has read the script, and shooting might begin after lockdown. Antony Perumbavoor who produced Drishyam returns as the producer. Jeethu said that it is a direct continuation of the last film and for that he has retained the principal characters along with some new additions in the secondary cast. In the turn of events, Georgekutty and his family now leads an affluent life and Georgekutty has opened a cinema theatre and is also planning to produce a film.

Filming 
Principal photography began on 21 September 2020 in Kochi. It was conducted adhering to the safety precautions set for preventing COVID-19 spread. Indoor scenes were shot there. Filming was held at Kakkanad, Kochi. It was shifted to Thodupuzha after two weeks. The same house at Vazhithala featured as Georegekutty and family's residence in Drishyam was used as the location for Drishyam 2, reportedly, an 18-day shoot was charted at the house. The house was renovated to reflect Georgekutty's present-day prosperity. Filming was also held at some other houses in Thodupuzha, and was also shot at nearby areas such as Kanjar and Arakkulam.

A set was constructed at Kaipa Kavala in Kudayathoor where Drishyam was filmed. An entire street was erected at the place, including Rajakkadu Police Station, Georgekutty's cable TV shop, and surrounding stores and structures, which was one of the main locations. Rajeev Kovilakathu was the art director. Following the portions at Kaipa Kavala, filming was concluded on 6 November 2020. The entire filming, which was scheduled to last for 56 days was completed in 46 days. Special team was designated to observe the film crew, including the director, were abiding the COVID-19 protocol.

Music 
The songs and the film score were composed by Anil Johnson, with lyrics by Vinayak Sasikumar. The music album consists of only one song titled "Ore Pakal" which was recorded by Zonobia Safar, and was released on 10 February 2021 by Saina Music.

Marketing and release 
Director Jeethu Joseph stated the plans for a theatrical release on 22 January 2021 before Mohanlal's big-budget film Marakkar: Lion of the Arabian Sea, citing that it is served to be a "litmus test in getting the audience back when theatres reopen". However, as the Kerala Film Chamber decided against reopening theatres since they demanded relief package from the government as theatre business took a severe hit following the coronavirus-induced lockdown and full exemption from entertainment tax, plans for the theatrical release had interrupted and the team opted for the digital streaming platform Amazon Prime Video to distribute the film. A teaser released on the occasion of New Year's Day, confirmed that it will release in Amazon Prime Video.

The film's official trailer was supposed to be unveiled on 8 February 2021, however on 6 February (two days before the trailer release), the trailer was leaked online which resulted the team to release the trailer officially on the same day, also announcing the release date of 19 February 2021. However, Drishyam 2 was released worldwide on the midnight of 18 February 2021, and was made available for streaming in over 240 countries.

The move for direct-to-digital release of Drishyam 2 met with criticism from theatre owners and distributors, with Liberty Basheer president of Kerala Film Exhibitors Federations, opined that "a prominent actor-like Mohanlal accepting this, is a selfish act" and opined that the film will easily bring "huge audience to movie theatres, being the sequel to one of the most successful films in the last decade". However, few trade analysts and members from the film circuit supported that "it is due to Anthony Perumbavoor's (the film producer) financial constraints. He had paid advance from theatre owners to screen Marakkar: Lion of the Arabian Sea, since it is a huge film and made for theatrical experience. But he did not pay advance from Drishyam 2, which is why he accepted for a digital release." In an online interaction with fans, prior to the film's release, Mohanlal stated that there are possibilities for a theatrical re-release. However, Kerala Film Chamber denied the producer's request for theatrical release of Drishyam 2 stating that they would not violate the guidelines by releasing a film in theatres, which is speculated for an online platform release.

Critical reception 
On the review aggregator website Rotten Tomatoes, the film has a score of 88% based on eight reviews, with an average rating of 7.5/10.

Aishwarya Vasudevan of the Daily News and Analysis gave a 4 out of 5 star rating and wrote, "Drishyam 2 is a gripping tale of an investigation and a family which is threatened by it, is a must-watch sequel we didn't know we deserved and the film will make you think for hours after you completed watching it". Sanjith Sidhardhan of The Times of India gave a 4 out of 5 star rating, and stated "Jeethu's script for the sequel is tight as ever; like Drishyam ... the film is an expertly crafted sequel meant for the audience to enjoy and the team to be proud of", and also praised Mohanlal's acting. Haricharan Pudippedi of Hindustan Times wrote that "It's no exaggeration to call Drishyam 2 one of the best sequels ever", it is "a thoroughly gripping and entertaining sequel, a rare occurrence in Indian cinema. Powered by top class writing and plenty of unexpected twists, the sequel packs a solid punch and makes for a riveting watch right till the end. Drishyam 2 is a masterclass in suspense building and it works as effectively as the first part if not better".

Rating 4 out of 5 stars, Sowmya Rajendran of The News Minute said that this "thriller is a superb sequel ... looking at the strength of the writing, it looks like in Jeethu's mind, Drishyam was always supposed to be two films". Rating 4 out of 5 stars, Suresh Mathew of The Quint said that "Mohanlal's gripping thriller is a winner again ... unlike the original, Drishyam 2 grips you from the very start ... Drishyam 2 is a worthy contender to the original. It grabs your attention from the word go and entertains you throughout its two-and-a-half-hour duration", he also praised Mohanlal's acting. Anna M. M. Vetticad of Firstpost called it "a surprisingly satisfying sequel to a spectacular first film ... Drishyam 2 is clever in the way it smoothly slips back into the world of Drishyam ... it now feels as if Part 1 is incomplete without Part 2". Janaki K. of India Today called it "a fitting sequel to Drishyam" and stated "Jeethu Joseph’s staging and strengths to work on a solid script are the film’s assets ... Mohanlal is just excellent", rating 3.5 out of 5 stars.

Film critic Baradwaj Rangan called it a "solid sequel, which swaps tension with existentialism", with a "superb structure. Like Part 1, this is more a writer’s film than a director’s film", he praised the writing – "it’s basic exposition, scene after scene" and "the writing during the climactic portions treats Part 1/Part 2 of Drishyam as two halves of the same story. It’s a brilliant meta touch ... the film is at its best when we look at Part 1/Part 2 as one unified universe". Tina Sara Anien of Deccan Herald rated 4 out of 5 stars, calling it "a thrilling, befitting sequel" and that "Drishyam 2 quashes the notion that sequels lack the magic of the originals ... not many thrillers have succeeded to impress an audience by intensifying the original's plot and that's the clinching proof of this film's special quality". Sajin Shrijith of The New Indian Express also rated 4 in a scale of 5, describing it as "a richer, expansive, and far superior sequel ... successful sequels are a rarity, and rarer still is a sequel that surpasses the original. Drishyam 2 is one such".

Rating 4 out of 5 stars, Sify critic said "It is not always that a sequel lives up to the huge expectations of the highly successful original. Drishyam 2 does that in a brilliant way ... with an engaging script, Jeethu Joseph has presented the sequel in a gripping manner". Joginder Tuteja of Rediff.com said that "this Mohanlal suspense drama may well go down as yet another modern day classic ... this is a true sequel to Drishyam and is, in fact, the first ever suspense thriller to move from the first to the second part with a seamless ease", he rated 3.5 out of 5. Gautaman Bhaskaran of News18 wrote that "Mohanlal returns with more vigour and charisma ... Georgekutty is not a man to be cowed down, and the rest of the movie is an exciting game of how he foxes the cops and saves his family. The twist, in the end, is simply superb", he rated 3 out of 5 stars.

Critic from Asianet News rated 4 out of 5 and called it a "perfect sequel" and that its "a must-watch for the sheer brilliance of Georgekutty aka Mohanlal and the marvellous script of Jeethu Joseph". Saibal Chatterjee of NDTV gave a 2.5 out of 5 stars and wrote, "Mohanlal is flawless yet again ... in terms of structure and rhythm, writer-director Jeethu Joseph follows pretty much the arc of the original film", but felt "the writing could have done with more punch". S. R. Praveen of The Hindu opined, "Drishyam 2 might not work as a stand-alone film — as many sequels do — since it is completely dependent on the first film with constant references. But despite its negatives, it still is a decent companion piece to its much celebrated predecessor". However, Nirmal Narayanan of IB Times felt that it "failed to match the cinematic making quality of its ... the first half of the movie had its originality, but the second half of the film was a pure letdown, as it questioned the thinking capability", but he praised Mohanlal's acting.

Sequel 
After the release of Drishyam 2, producer Antony Perumbavoor commented that it is possible for a third film in the series, although Jeethu had neither confirmed nor denied it. Antony also said that Jeethu is researching on possible story arcs for Drishyam 3, and there had been discussions with Mohanlal. On 23 February 2021, Jeethu said in a press conference that he currently has figured out the climax for Drishyam 3, but the screenplay and production may take at least three years to materialise.

Remakes 
The film was remade in Kannada as Drishya 2 directed by P. Vasu and in Telugu as Drushyam 2 (2021) by Jeethu Joseph himself. The Hindi remake titled Drishyam 2 directed by Abhishek Pathak was released in theatres on 18 November 2022.

References

External links 
 
 

2020s Malayalam-language films
2021 crime drama films
Aashirvad Cinemas films
Amazon Prime Video original films
Films about families
Films directed by Jeethu Joseph
Films not released in theaters due to the COVID-19 pandemic
Films set in India
Indian sequel films
Indian thriller films
Malayalam films in series
Works about unsolved crimes
Malayalam films remade in other languages